The Praktikos is a guide to ascetic life written by the early Christian monk Evagrius Ponticus. It was originally written in Greek, but also has Syriac and Armenian versions. This work is the best preserved of all the Evagrian writings due to the relatively large number of manuscripts and wide distribution (Bamberger 1972:lix-lx).

The Praktikos consists of 100 chapters. Of the 100 chapters of the Praktikos, demons are mentioned in 67 of them.

Although originally written in Greek, there are manuscripts of the Praktikos in Syriac, Armenian, Ethiopic (Ge'ez), Georgian, and Arabic.

Outline
Below is a brief outline of the 100 chapters of the Praktikos.

Introductory letter to Anatolius
[1-5] Prologue
[6-14] The eight kinds of evil thought (logismoi)
[7] Gluttony
[8] Impurity (lust; sexual immorality)
[9] Avarice
[10] Sadness
[11] Anger
[12] Acedia ("noonday demon"; sloth)
[13] Vainglory
[14] Pride
[15-39] Against the eight passionate thoughts (logismoi)
[40-56] Instructions
[57-62] The state bordering on apatheia
[63-90] On the signs of apatheia
[91-100] Apophthegmata: Sayings of the holy monks
Epilogue to Anatolius

A more detailed outline is given as follows:

Preface: Letter to Anatolius on the symbolic meaning of monastic clothing
Chapters 1–5: Introduction
1: Christianity as faith/practice (praktikē), contemplation of nature (physikē), and knowledge of God (theologikē)
2–3: Kingdom of God and knowledge of the Trinity
4: Desire, feeling, passion
5: The monastic combat against demons
Chapters 6–14: On the Eight Thoughts (logismoi)
6: List of the eight
7: Gluttony (gastrimargia)
8: Fornication (porneia)
9: Love of money (philarguria)
10: Sadness (lupē)
11: Anger (orgē)
12: Listlessness (acēdia)
13: Vainglory (kenodoxia)
14: Pride (huperēphania)
Chapters 15–33: Against the Eight Thoughts
Chapters 34–39: On the Passions
Chapters 40–53: Instructions
Chapters 54–56: On What Takes Place During Sleep
Chapters 57–62: On the State Close to Passionlessness (apatheia)
Chapters 63–70: On the Signs of Passionlessness
Chapters 71–90: Practical Considerations
Chapters 91–100: Sayings of Holy Monks
91: Fasting joined to charity leads to purity of heart
92: Antony and the philosophers
93: Macarius the Egyptian
94: Macarius [the Alexandrian]
95–99: Anonymous apophthegms
100: Loving the brethren
Epilogue: Prayer to Christ; rejoicing for the intercession of Gregory of Nazianzus

See also
Hesychasm
Gnostikos

References

Bamberger, John Eudes, trans. 1972. Evagrius Ponticus: The Praktikos. Chapters on Prayer. Kalamazoo, Michigan: Cistercian Publications.
Meyendorff, John. 1974. St. Gregory Palamas and orthodox spirituality. Crestwood, New York: St. Vladimir's Seminary Press.

Further reading
Bamberger, John Eudes, trans. 1972. Evagrius Ponticus: The Praktikos. Chapters on Prayer. Kalamazoo, Michigan: Cistercian Publications.
Evagrius Ponticus, Praktikos & On Prayer. Oxford: Faculty of Theology, 1987.
Sinkewicz, Robert E., trans. 2003. Evagrius Ponticus, The Greek Ascetic Corpus Oxford: Oxford University Press.

External links

The Praktikos online, with Greek text (Translation by Luke Dysinger, O.S.B.)
Luke Dysinger's English translation of the Praktikos of Evagrios Pontikos

Hesychast literature
4th-century books